Russell Lee Arms (February 3, 1920 – February 13, 2012) was an American actor and singer.

Career
Arms was born on February 3, 1920 in Berkeley, California, gaining acting experience via the Pasadena Playhouse. He began his career on radio, including working at WNEW in New York City.

He moved up to minor screen roles during World War II as a contract player with Warner Bros. In his screen debut, he played Richard, the son of the Stanleys, in 1942's The Man Who Came to Dinner. He later worked as a freelance performer, mostly in Westerns. Subsequently, he appeared in supporting roles in both feature films and television. In 1953 he played the role of Chester Finley, a piano instructor and hopeful suitor to Doris Day, in the film By the Light of the Silvery Moon.

From 1952 to 1957, he was best known as a vocalist on Your Hit Parade, an NBC television series that reviewed the popular songs of the day and on which a regular cast of vocalists would perform the top seven songs of the week. Arms and Eileen Wilson (who starred on the show from 1950 to 1952) were the only surviving lead performers from the show until Arms' death in 2012. He authored an autobiography in 2005, My Hit Parade ... and a Few Misses. During his career as a singer, he was also well known for his 1957 hit single, "Cinco Robles (Five Oaks)", which entered the charts on January 12, 1957 and stayed there for 15 weeks, peaking at No. 22. In 1957, he released the album Where Can A Wanderer Go, on the Era label. The same year he was a singer on The Hidden Treasure Show, "the first nationwide quiz show in which home viewers win the money...". The syndicated program was sponsored by Disabled American Veterans.

On television dramas, Arms made three guest appearances on Perry Mason, including the role of Attorney Everett Dorrell in the 1960 episode "The Case of the Credulous Quarry", and as Roger Correll in the 1963 episode "The Case of the Greek Goddess". Additionally, he appeared in the 1961 episode "Bad Sheriff" on the long-running series Gunsmoke, portraying a crooked lawman who tries to keep the money seized by stagecoach robbers. For the next two decades he continued to act periodically in other television series, including the CBS sitcom Ichabod and Me in 1962 and the NBC drama Gibbsville in 1976.

A 1958 newspaper story about Arms noted, "Although Arms started in show business as an actor, he became a singer 'by accident,' and now he can't get anyone to believe he can act. 'I'm now in the process of proving them wrong,' he said."

Military years
He was a graduate of the Signal Corps OCS program out of Ft. Monmouth, New Jersey (1941–46) and again at Ft. Monmouth (1951–53).

Personal life
Arms and his second wife, Mary Lynne, resided in Palm Springs, California for many years. They then moved to Hamilton, Illinois, where Arms died on February 13, 2012, aged 92.

Filmography

Partial discography
The Touch (1954 - Epic 5-9079)
Cinco Robles (1957 - Era 1026)
Evangeline (1957 - Era 1033)

References

External links

 
 

Male actors from Berkeley, California
American country singer-songwriters
American male film actors
American male singer-songwriters
American male pop singers
American male television actors
Era Records artists
Musicians from Berkeley, California
1920 births
2012 deaths
United States Army officers
20th-century American male actors
American male radio actors
Singer-songwriters from California
Male actors from Palm Springs, California
People from Hamilton, Illinois
Country musicians from California
Country musicians from Illinois
20th-century American male singers
20th-century American singers
Singer-songwriters from Illinois
Military personnel from California
Military personnel from Illinois